Santa Fe Saddlemates is a 1945 American Western film directed by Thomas Carr and written by Bennett Cohen. Starring Sunset Carson, Linda Stirling, Olin Howland, Roy Barcroft, Bud Geary and Kenne Duncan, it was released on June 2, 1945, by Republic Pictures.

Plot

Cast  
Sunset Carson as Sunset Carson
Linda Stirling as Ann Morton
Olin Howland as Dead Eye
Roy Barcroft as John Gant
Bud Geary as Spur Brannon
Kenne Duncan as Brazos Kane
George Chesebro as Fred Loder
Robert J. Wilke as Henchman Rawhide
Henry Wills as Henchman Denver
Forbes Murray as Inspector Burke
Frank Jaquet as Governor L. Bradford Prince
Johnny Carpenter as Henchman Mills 
Rex Lease as Smiley

References

External links 
 

1945 films
American Western (genre) films
1945 Western (genre) films
Republic Pictures films
Films directed by Thomas Carr
American black-and-white films
1940s English-language films
1940s American films